L. C. Simonds Adirondack Cabin, also known as "Breezy Bluff Cottage," is a historic home located near Clemons, Washington County, New York. It was built in 1910 and is a rustic Adirondack-style dwelling.

Description
The Simonds Adirondack Cabin is a log cabin constructed of spruce logs, and has a -story main block with a kitchen addition The main block has a medium-pitched gable roof with pent roof dormers.  It features a verandah that once wrapped around the building and a pink granite fireplace.

The structure was added to the National Register of Historic Places in 2010.

See also
Adirondack Architecture
Rustic architecture
National Register of Historic Places listings in Washington County, New York

References

Houses completed in 1910
Houses on the National Register of Historic Places in New York (state)
Houses in Washington County, New York
Log cabins in the United States
Rustic architecture in New York (state)
National Register of Historic Places in Washington County, New York
Log buildings and structures on the National Register of Historic Places in New York (state)
1910 establishments in New York (state)